Maya Caldwell (born December 15, 1998) is an American professional basketball player for the Indiana Fever of the Women’s National Basketball Association (WNBA). She played college basketball at Georgia.

College career
Caldwell came out of high school as the 76th overall ranked recruit according to the ESPN HoopGurlz Rankings. Caldwell committed to Georgia to play collegiately. She stated that part of the reason for choosing the Bulldogs program was that "Athens just felt like home...If I didn't have basketball, where would I want to be?' Athens was the place."

Caldwell played in all 33 games as a freshman and led the team in 3-point field goal percentage. She scored a season high 20 points against Howard on December 19, 2017. With those 20 points, she became the first Bulldog player to score 20 points as a freshman since 2014. During her sophomore season, Caldwell came off the bench again until the last 10 games of the season – when she became the team's starting forward. Once inserted into the starting lineup, Caldwell increased her scoring to 9.0 ppg from 3.4 ppg.

During her junior and senior seasons, Caldwell stayed in the starting lineup and became a solid, consistent player for Georgia. During her season season, Caldwell scored a career high 27 points against Florida. She was also named to the SEC All-Tournament Team in 2021.

College statistics

Professional career

WNBA

Indiana Fever
In the 2021 WNBA Draft, Caldwell was taken 33rd overall by the Indiana Fever. Caldwell made it through a week of training camp before getting cut from the Fever.

Atlanta Dream
On February 23, 2022, Caldwell signed a training camp contract with the Atlanta Dream. On May 5, 2022, Caldwell was waived from the Dream training camp. On June 20, 2022, Caldwell was brought back to the Dream on a hardship contract. After appearing in 3 games for the Dream, Caldwell was released from her Hardship Contract on June 27, 2022.

Overseas

Gran Canaria
Caldwell played the 2021–2022 season in Spain for Spar Gran Canaria. She averaged 15.5 points, 5.1 rebounds, 1.8 assists, and 1.5 steals in 26 games for them.

WNBA career statistics

Regular season

|-
| align="left" | 2022
| align="left" | Atlanta
| 9 || 7 || 23.8 || .514 || .563 || .800 || 2.4 || 2.2 || 0.8 || 0.2 || 1.6 || 10.9
|-
| align="left" | Career
| align="left" | 1 year, 1 team
| 9 || 7 || 23.8 || .514 || .563 || .800 || 2.4 || 2.2 || 0.8 || 0.2 || 1.6 || 10.9

References

External links
WNBA bio
Georgia Bulldogs bio

1998 births
Living people
American women's basketball players
Basketball players from North Carolina
Guards (basketball)
Georgia Lady Bulldogs basketball players
Indiana Fever draft picks
Atlanta Dream players
People from Charlotte, North Carolina